Serafín Donderis (c. 1820 – c. 1885) was Mayor of Ponce, Puerto Rico, in 1875. He was a Spanish military officer with the rank of Coronel.

Mayoral term
On 14 February 1875, construction started on the Acueducto de Ponce at a cost of $220,000 ($ in  dollars), and became operational in 1878.

See also

 List of Puerto Ricans
List of mayors of Ponce, Puerto Rico

References

Further reading
 Fay Fowlie de Flores. Ponce, Perla del Sur: Una Bibliográfica Anotada. Second Edition. 1997. Ponce, Puerto Rico: Universidad de Puerto Rico en Ponce. p. 335. Item 1667. 
 Villa de Ponce. Presupuesto municipal del ilustre Ayuntamiento de la Villa de Ponce para el año económico de 1874 a 1875. Ponce, Puerto Rico: H. Lara—Imprenta Nueva, 1874. (Biblioteca del Congreso (Washington, D.C.; Colegio Universitario Tecnológico de Ponce, CUTPO [fotocopia])

Mayors of Ponce, Puerto Rico
1820s births
1880s deaths
Year of birth uncertain
Year of death uncertain